Cameron Silver is fashion director, retailer, and entertainment personality. Silver is the currently fashion director of the brand Halston.

In 2002, he was named one of Time magazine's "25 Most Influential Names and Faces in Fashion." In 2013, the first season of his Bravo reality television series Dukes of Melrose debuted.

In 2021, he debuted his syndicated Instagram Live series "Candid Cameron in The Hamptons" which was produced and directed by producer Sam Pezzullo.

Early life
Cameron was born in Los Angeles and grew up in Beverly Hills. 

Silver released an album with Hollywood Records called Berlin to Babylon.

Decades
Silver is the founder of Decades, a vintage couture boutique in Los Angeles, California. Clients include Chloe Sevigny, Julia Roberts, Gwyneth Paltrow, Dita von Teese, Rihanna, Lady Gaga.

Collaborations
Silver is the director of H by Halston, which was launched on QVC in September 2015, with Silver as its on-air pitchman. 

He has been linked with such brands as Pringle and Boucheron, for whom he has been an official brand ambassador, and Azzaro, for whom he served as creative consultant.

Other Work
Silver has worked with the Met, the LACMA, the MOCA and the Art of Elysium.

In January 2012, Silver was recognized as the Year's Visionary by The Art of Elysium.

In February 2012, in conjunction with the 2012 awards season, Silver assisted Curators at the Museum of Contemporary Art's Design Center in Los Angeles (MOCA) with an exhibit designed by Marmol Radziner. 

As a fashion commentator, he has made appearances on  E! Entertainment, the Style Network andFashion File. He has also written for Harpers Bazaar (UK), C Magazine, Departures, Style.com.

References

External links
 Official Cameron Silver website
 Decades
 CameronDecades on Twitter
 Cameron Silver In.com
 Gilt.com
 Bloomsbury Publishing
 IMDb.com: "Versailles '73: American Runway Revolution" 

American fashion journalists
21st-century American journalists
21st-century American male writers
Living people
California people in fashion
Writers from Los Angeles
Year of birth missing (living people)
Journalists from California
American male non-fiction writers
American male journalists